Perrin-Whitt Consolidated Independent School District is a public school district based in the community of Perrin, Texas (USA). The district emerged from the combination of Perrin (est. 1914) and Whitt school districts in the 1960s.

In addition to Perrin, the district also serves the community of Whitt in northwestern Parker County.

In 2009, the school district was rated "academically acceptable" by the Texas Education Agency.

The district changed to a four day school week in fall 2022.

Schools
Perrin Junior/Senior High (Grades 7-12)
Perrin Elementary (Grades PK-6)
Colors Navy Blue and Gold,
Mascot Pirates

References

External links

'About Us' Page

 
School districts in Jack County, Texas
School districts in Parker County, Texas